Urban Retail Properties is a third-party retail management company based in Chicago. The company develops shopping complexes and other retail centers across the United States, in addition to help managing retail space development. The company partnered with Long Runn Urban Development Group in Shanghai in 2008.  As of 2021 it owns over 50 shopping centers. A news article in 2003 described Urban Retail as "the nation’s largest third-party retail manager".

History 
In 1984, Aetna sold Urban Investment and Development Corporation of Chicago, to JMB Real Estate Group, for $1.4 billion.

In 1993, JMB spun off its retail properties into Urban Shopping Centers, and was traded on NYSE and CSE under "URB".

In 2000, Urban was purchased by Rodamco North America.

In 2001, Westfield Trust bought 25% of USC and Rodamco North America. The next year, Rodamco was fully sold to Westfield, Rouse, and Simon Property Group.

In May 2005, Urban was purchased in a management buyout deal, becoming a private entity.

In September 2007, RAIT Urban Holdings, LLC acquired a minority interest in Urban.

In May 2014, RAIT Financial Trust purchases Urban Retail Properties.

In September 2018, Urban becomes a private partnership firm when Forum Partners Investment, LLC purchased half of Urban from RAIT.

Properties owned by Urban Retail
Major retail properties owned by Urban Retail include:

Current 
 Somersville Towne Center
 Orlando Fashion Square
 Mall at Stonecrest
 Louisiana Boardwalk
 Monroe Crossing
 Arnot Mall
 Colony Square Mall
 College Square Mall
 Foothills Mall

Former

Urban Shopping Centers 

 Copley Place (sold in 1997)

Purchased by Westfield 

 Brandon Town Center
 Century City Shopping Center
 Citrus Park Town Center
 Countryside Mall
 Fox Valley Center
 Franklin Park Mall
 Galleria at Roseville
 Garden State Plaza
 Great Northern Mall
 Hawthorn Center
 MainPlace
 Old Orchard Center
 San Francisco Shopping Centre
 Valencia Town Center

Purchased by Simon 

 Coral Square Mall
 Florida Mall
 Houston Galleria
 Mall at Chestnut Hill
 Maplewood Mall
 Miami International Mall
 Penn Square Mall
 Pheasant Lane Mall
 SouthPark Mall
 West Town Mall
 Wolfchase Galleria
 Woodland Hills Mall

Purchased by Rouse 

 Collin Creek
 Lakeside Mall
 North Star Mall
 Oakbrook Center
 Perimeter Mall
 The Streets at Southpoint (under construction at the time)
 Water Tower Place
 Willowbrook

Urban Retail 

 Inlet Square Mall
 PlazAmericas
 Oakland Mall
 Manhattan Town Center
 Oakland Square
 Oakland Plaza

References

External links

Companies based in Chicago
Commercial real estate companies
Shopping center management firms
Companies with year of establishment missing